Gonzalo Sebastián Andrada Acosta (born 4 July 1997) is a Uruguayan footballer who plays as a midfielder for C.A. Progreso in the Uruguayan Primera División.

Career

Progreso
In January 2019, Andrada joined Uruguayan Primera División club Progreso. He made his debut for the club on 16 February 2019, coming on as a 56th-minute substitute for Facundo Moreira in a 4-3 victory over Rampla Juniors.

Career statistics

Club

References

External links

1997 births
Living people
C.A. Progreso players
Uruguayan Primera División players
Uruguayan footballers
Association football midfielders